The 2009 Kansas Jayhawks football team (variously "Kansas", "KU", or the "Jayhawks") represented the University of Kansas in the 2009 NCAA Division I FBS football season, which was the school's 120th season and the eighth and final year under Mark Mangino, who resigned following the season under pressure from both an internal investigation into his treatment of players and discontent from the season's results. It was Ed Warinner's third season as offensive coordinator and fifth year overall. The Jayhawks played their home games at Memorial Stadium in Lawrence, Kansas and were members of the Big 12 Conference

After beginning the season with five victories, the team lost their next seven games to finish the season with a 5–7 overall record (1–7 in the Big 12 Conference). It was the worst overall record since 2004 (when the Jayhawks won just four games) and the worst conference record since their winless 2002 season (in which they could only win two non-conference games).

Pre-season

Coaching changes
Less than a month after being promoted to defensive coordinator at Louisville Bill Miller resigned and joined the Jayhawks as co-defensive coordinator and linebackers coach, replacing previous linebackers coach Steve Tovar.

Tom Sims replaced Joe Bob Clements, who left for Kansas State, as defensive line coach. Sims spent the last four seasons with Illinois. A few weeks earlier, Kerry Locklin of Fresno State accepted the defensive line coaching job, but subsequently accepted a job with the NFL's New York Jets and Sims was hired instead.

Recruiting
Following the 2009 signing day, the Jayhawks recruiting class was ranked 31st by Rivals and 50 by Scout. Expand the list below to see the full class.

Schedule

Roster
In February, reserve quarterback Tyler Lawrence left the team to graduate early. Running back Sean Ransburg was listed as a transfer at MidAmerica Nazarene University in Olathe. Wide receiver Xavier Rambo is listed as a transfer at Delta State University.  Running back Jocques Crawford's transfer to an unnamed school was announced July 24.  KU announced Ben Lueken's departure August 6.

Game summaries

Northern Colorado
Kansas won its first ever match-up against Northern Colorado in convincing fashion as the 25th ranked team in the nation. This was the sixth straight home-opener win for Kansas. It was also a new attendance record with 52,530 fans in attendance.

Senior Quarterback Todd Reesing directed the Kansas offense to success from the start of the game. He threw for 208 yards on 13 attempts and 2 touchdowns. Furthermore, he also ran for 79 yards and scored 2 rushing touchdowns. This was Reesing's most successful game in terms of rushing since the 2007 season. Reesing found numerous opportunities to run as Northern Colorado was preoccupied with slowing Kansas' passing attack. Kansas' passing attack was also hurt by the 1-game suspension of leading wide-receiver Desmond Briscoe.  Senior running-back Jake Sharp led Kansas in rushing with 123 yards on 21 carries and 2 touchdowns (1 rushing, 1 receiving). Senior wide-receiver Kerry Meier led the team with 5 receptions for 115 yards.

Freshman running-back Toben Opurum had a notable first game in a Kansas uniform. He ran for 79 yards on 8 carries and scored 2 touchdowns. Backup red-shirt Freshman Quarterback Kale Pick also played his first minutes in a Kansas uniform in the 4th Quarter.

UTEP

Senior DE Maxwell Onyegbule and the Jayhawk defense set the tone early as the University of Kansas football team rolled past UTEP 34–7 in front of 31,885 fans in the Sun Bowl. Senior QB Todd Reesing guided the offense to over 575 yards of total offense as KU improved to 2-0 for the sixth straight season, while the Miners fell to 0–2.

In the first half alone, Onyegbule had two sacks and four total tackles for loss to lead a defense that finished the half with five sacks, 11 tackles for loss, an interception and a pair of quarterback hurries.  UTEP was forced to punt on six of its seven possessions of the half and mustered just three first downs.  For the game, the defense held UTEP to just 208 yards and seven first downs.  Seven players recorded tackles for losses led by Onyegbule with five. Add to that line six quarterback hurries, three passes broken up and an interception, and it was a good night for the defense in El Paso.

Reesing finished 25-of-41 for 260 yards, one touchdown and one interception.  Kansas racked up 576 total yards and outdid the Miners 23–7 on first downs.

The win also improved Mark Mangino's overall record to 47–41 at Kansas which tied him with Glen Mason as the second-winningest coach in school history.  A.R. Kennedy owns KU's best coaching record at 52-9-4 from 1904 to 1910.

Duke

Kansas senior quarterback Todd Reesing threw for 338 yards and three touchdowns and also collected 51 yards on the ground to lead Kansas to a 44–16 win over Duke on a sunny Saturday afternoon at Memorial Stadium.  The win improved Kansas to 3–0 on the season, marking the second time in the last three seasons the Jayhawks opened the season with three-consecutive wins. The loss dropped the Blue Devils to 1–2.

Reesing completed 28-of-41 passes against the Blue Devils, including touchdowns to three different receivers. His 338 yards in the air marked his seventh-straight game with 200 or more passing yards and his 14th career 300-yard passing game.  Briscoe finished the game with 117 yards receiving, his sixth-straight 100-yard receiving game. He now has nine 100-yard receiving games in his career, the most in KU history.

Senior safety Darrell Stuckey led the Jayhawk defense with a season-high 10 tackles. Freshman linebacker Huldon Tharp recorded a career-high 10 tackles, while junior linebacker Drew Dudley finished with a career-best eight tackles. Sophomore cornerback Daymond Patterson also had eight stops. Senior nickelback Justin Thornton and junior cornerback Chris Harris each added six tackles. KU finished with five sacks on the afternoon, giving the Jayhawks 14 sacks on the season.

Southern Miss

Senior wide receiver Kerry Meier hauled in 10 passes for a career-high 141 yards and two touchdowns and senior quarterback Todd Reesing passed former Texas quarterback Vince Young for seventh on the All-time Big 12 total yards list as No. 19 Kansas defeated Southern Mississippi 35–28 at Memorial Stadium.  The victory improved Kansas to 4–0 on the season, marking the second time in the last three seasons the Jayhawks opened the season with four-consecutive wins. The defeat dropped Southern Mississippi to 3-1 ending the nation's second longest winning streak at eight games.

Reesing completed 30-of-41 passes against the Golden Eagles, including touchdowns to two different receivers. His 331 yards in the air marked his eighth-straight game with 200 or more passing yards and his 15th career 300-yard passing game.

The game was a back-and-forth battle that was tied late in the game when Kansas received ideal field position for the second-straight drive after Darrell Stuckey posted a 50-yard kick return to place the ball at the Southern Miss 40-yard line just before the end of the third quarter. This time the Jayhawks took advantage of the kick return, and Reesing found Meier uncovered for a 12-yard touchdown, his second of the game, to make the score 35–28.

Both teams traded possessions before Kansas' defense forced Southern Mississippi to punt with three minutes remaining. But the Jayhawks couldn't muster a first down, giving the Golden Eagles an opportunity to tie the game.  The Jayhawk defense then stepped up to the challenge as junior defensive end Jake Laptad sacked Davis on third down and sophomore cornerback Daymond Patterson batted down two passes to force a turnover on downs and seal the victory.

Iowa State

Kansas senior wide receiver Kerry Meier set a school record with 16 receptions for 142 yards and two touchdowns, while senior quarterback Todd Reesing tied a school record with 37 completions for a career-high 442 yards and four touchdowns as No. 16 Kansas outlasted Iowa State 41–36.  Before a crowd of 48,203 at Kivisto Field at Memorial Stadium, Kansas improves to 5-0 for the second time in three years, and 1–0 in Big 12 Conference play. Iowa State drops to 3-3 overall and 0–2 in league play.

Reesing's main two targets for the afternoon were Meier, with his record-setting 16 receptions and junior wide receiver Dezmon Briscoe, who had 12 catches for 186 yards and two touchdowns. Meier and Briscoe ended the day as KU's career receptions leaders with Meier first at 167 and Briscoe at 165. For Reesing, it was his second 400-yard passing day.

Despite the offensive firepower displayed by the Jayhawks, the team needed a fourth-down stop at its own 31-yard line to solidify the win.  Trailing by five with 2:36 remaining in the game, ISU regained possession on its own 34-yard line and marched to the KU 31 before the Jayhawks' defense held fast to produce a turnover on downs. KU defensive back Chris Harris made a huge tackle of Iowa State receiver Jake Williams on second-and-10 and then broke up the third-down pass, resulting in a fourth-and-nine attempt for the Cyclones. On fourth down, pressure forced ISU quarterback Austen Arnuad's pass to sail incomplete.

Colorado

Despite erasing a 21-point deficit, the University of Kansas football team could not pull off the win as Colorado escaped with a 34–30 victory over the Jayhawks in front of 51,146 fans in Boulder. KU dropped to 5-1 overall and 1–1 in the Big 12, while Colorado improved to 2-4 overall and 1–1 in the league.  The lead changed hands twice in the fourth quarter and Kansas had the chance to win on the final play of the game.  In the end, it wasn't meant to be for KU.

KU led 3–0 at the end of the first quarter only to see Colorado score 24 unanswered points.  KU closed the gap to 24-10 before the first half ended, but Colorado opened the second half with a 39-yard field goal to extend their lead back to 17 points.  Kansas then rallied, dominating on both sides of the ball into the early fourth quarter, scoring 20 straight points to take a 30–27 lead with 12:57 remaining in the game.  Not to be outdone, the Buffaloes put together a 10-play, 76-yard touchdown drive to re-take the lead.  Kansas had two more chances to score before the game ended, first on a 10-play, 74-yard drive that included a Reesing-to-Meier touchdown pass that would have given the Jayhawks the lead, only it was nullified due to an offensive pass interference call.  Ultimately the Jayhawks turned the ball over on downs.  They managed to force a Colorado punt and take one final possession with 24 seconds left in the game, but a heavily covered Dezmon Briscoe could not hold on to a Reesing pass in the end zone as time expired.  As the game went final, the Colorado fans stormed the field.

The loss began what eventually became a 46-game losing streak for games on the road for the Jayhawks. They wouldn't win another road game until 2018.

Oklahoma

Despite holding Oklahoma to just 337 yards of total offense - nearly 100 yards below the Sooners' season average - the Jayhawks suffered a 35–13 loss to OU at Kivisto Field at Memorial Stadium. The Jayhawks dropped to 5-2 overall and 1–2 in the Big 12, while the Sooners improved to 4-3 and 2–2 in league play.

Kansas quarterback Todd Reesing threw for 224 yards, but his three first-half interceptions put the Jayhawks behind 14-0 early, one of OU's touchdowns coming on an 85-yard interception return for a touchdown by Dominique Franks as Kansas was driving deep into Oklahoma territory.  Kansas answered with a pair of field goals by junior kicker Jacob Branstetter, including a career-long 57-yarder just before the end of the half, but despite cutting the deficit to a single possession, the Jayhawks could not contain the Oklahoma offense in the third quarter. The Sooners opened the second half with a nine-play, 75-yard drive that culminated with a nine-yard touchdown pass from Landry Jones to senior wide receiver Adron Tennell to give the Sooners a 21–6 advantage. OU extended its lead to 28–6 on its next possession, as Chris Brown hauled in an eight-yard TD pass from Jones.  After another Brown touchdown made it 35–6, the Jayhawks scored their only touchdown of the game late in fourth quarter on a run by Reesing.

Texas Tech

Four turnovers resulting in 28 Texas Tech points spoiled any chance of the University of Kansas football team picking up its sixth win as the Jayhawks fell to the Red Raiders 42–21 in front of 47,291 fans in Jones AT&T Stadium.  Kansas fell to 5-3 overall while Texas Tech improved to 6-3 (3-2 Big 12).  With four league games still left, KU dropped to 1–3 in the Big 12.

The first half of the game was an unexpected defensive struggle.  At halftime, the teams entered the locker room tied at 14, with Texas Tech outgaining Kansas 127 yards to 106 in the half. Kansas' two first half touchdowns each came after forced fumbles, while Texas Tech was also able to capitalize off of a Kansas turnover deep in KU territory.

KU took the lead 21–14 in the closing seconds of the third quarter after orchestrating an impressive 10-play, 81-yard drive. Kansas quarterback Todd Reesing connected with Dezmon Briscoe three times on the drive including a touchdown pass from six yards out.  On the play, Reesing twisted around to avoid a sack before finding Briscoe wide open in the endzone.  The hookup from Reesing to Briscoe was the 26th time the pair found each other for a touchdown in their careers. No other active tandem in college football has as many touchdowns.

Texas Tech responded immediately, tying the game on 80-yard drive capped off by a one-yard touchdown run by Baron Batch.  Kansas could not respond, fumbling they ball three times in their next four possessions, each inside their own 30-yard line.  Texas Tech capitalized each time, returning one of the fumbles for a touchdown and scoring two other touchdowns on short drives to result in the 42–21 final score. The game began a stretch of 151 consecutive games the Jayhawks would play unranked. The streak wouldn't end until October 8, 2022.

Kansas State

Despite a combined 168 yards receiving for KU senior Kerry Meier and junior Dezmon Briscoe, Kansas fell to Sunflower Showdown rival Kansas State, 17–10, at Bill Snyder Family Stadium.  After starting the season with five consecutive wins, the Jayhawks dropped to 5-4 overall and 1–4 in the Big 12.  K-State improves to 6-4 overall and 4–2 in conference play.

Kansas quarterback Todd Reesing racked up 266 yards, including 241 through the air, but committed three costly turnovers.  The 10 points scored by the Kansas offense was a season low. Reesing completed 27-of-41 passes for 241 yards and a touchdown, while Meier led the receiving corps with eight catches for 92 yards. Senior running back Jake Sharp gained 35 yards on 11 carries, while Reesing ran eight times for 25 yards.  Kansas freshmen Huldon Tharp and Lubbock Smith led the defense with nine tackles a piece, while Darrell Stuckey and Drew Dudley chipped in six.

Nebraska

After a low scoring three quarters, a fourth-quarter scoring flurry led to a 31-17 Nebraska victory against Kansas on Senior Day at Kivisto Field at Memorial Stadium. The loss dropped KU to 5-5 overall and 1–5 in Big 12 Conference action.

Kansas senior quarterback Todd Reesing found junior wide receiver Dezmon Briscoe wide open in the middle of the field and Briscoe ran it in for the score from 21 yards out to give Kansas its first lead of the day at 17–16 with 7:34 left to play. The Jayhawks' scoring drive amassed 89 yards on 10 plays capped by KU's first passing touchdown of the day.

Nebraska did not trail for long though. After a 44-yard kick-off return by Niles Paul, Nebraska quickly responded as Helu punched it in from 20 yards out just over a minute later. Nebraska quarterback Zac Lee then found Paul for the two-point conversion to push the `Huskers back into the lead at 24-17 with just over six minutes remaining.  After a KU punt, Nebraska took possession with 5:20 remaining on the game clock and burned nearly all of that with a 10-play, 74-yard drive capped by another Helu touchdown run that gave the Cornhuskers a two-touchdown lead with only 23 seconds left in the game.

Reesing finished the game 19-of-41 passing for 236 yards and one touchdown. He also turned in 42 yards rushing and a second touchdown. Kerry Meier led the Jayhawks in receiving with 10 catches for 127 yards, while Briscoe had four catches for 77 yards and a TD. Freshman running back Toben Opurum recorded 43 yards on the ground on 15 carries.

Texas

Despite 245 all-purpose yards from junior Dezmon Briscoe, the Kansas football team could not keep up with the high-powered Texas offense as the No. 3 Longhorns defeated the Jayhawks 51-20 before a sellout crowd of 101,357 at Texas Memorial Stadium.  Kansas dropped to 5-6 on the season, including 1-6 in Big 12 play. Texas improved to 11-0 on the season and 7-0 in conference play. The Longhorns’ win secured them the Big 12 South title.

For the game, Texas rolled up 532 yards total offense, while Kansas had 303 yards. Playing in his hometown of Austin, Texas, KU quarterback Todd Reesing ended the game 25 for 39 for 256 yards. Briscoe had five catches for 101 yards, while senior Kerry Meier had a team-high nine receptions 46 yards. Briscoe returned three kickoffs 144 yards, including a 98-yarder for a touchdown in the third quarter to make the score 44–20.

Colt McCoy led the Longhorns’ offensive charge by completing 32 passes on 41 attempts for 396 yards and four touchdowns. UT wide receiver James Kirkendoll had eight catches for 86 yards and two touchdowns, while senior Jordan Shipley had 10 receptions for 108 yards and one score.

Missouri

Despite a record-breaking day for senior quarterback Todd Reesing, Kansas fell to Missouri 41-39 after Reesing was sacked in the final seconds of the annual Border War game at Arrowhead Stadium in Kansas City.  Reesing set a school record for passing yards in a single game with 498 and tied his own school record for completions in a game with 37.  Kansas concluded its 2009 season at 5-7 overall and 1–7 in the Big 12, while Missouri improved to 8-4 overall and 4–4 in league play.

The 118th edition of the Border War was a hard-fought battle, with the winner determined in the final seconds as MU kicker Grant Ressel hit a 27-yard field goal as time expired.

Rankings

Awards and honors
Drew Dudley
Big 12 Conference Chick-Fil-A Fall Community of Champions honoree
ESPN The Magazine Academic First Team All-District 7

Maxwell Onyegbule
Big 12 Co-Defensive Player of the Week (Week 2)

Todd Reesing
ESPN The Magazine Academic First Team All-District 7
National Football Foundation National Scholar-Athlete
All Big 12 Honorable Mention
Cambell Trophy Finalist

Alonso Rojas
Ray Guy Award Candidate
All Big 12 Honorable Mention

Darrell Stuckey
Allstate AFCA Good Works Team
Jim Thorpe Award Finalist
All Big 12 Honorable Mention

Dezmon Briscoe
All Big 12 First Team

Kerry Meier
All Big 12 Second Team

Tanner Hawkinson
All Big 12 Honorable Mention

Jake Laptad
All Big 12 Honorable Mention

Statistics

Team

Scores by quarter

Offense

Rushing

Passing

Receiving

Defense

Special teams

References

Kansas
Kansas Jayhawks football seasons
Kansas Jayhawks football